Ak Yum is an ancient temple in the Angkor region of Cambodia. Helen Jessup dates the temple to the 8th century, and states it is the oldest known example of "temple mountain" in Southeast Asia.

The origins and repair history of the temple are unclear. Stone carrying inscriptions, including one with a date corresponding to Saturday 10 June 674 AD during the reign of king Jayavarman I. The first structure on the site was a single-chamber brick sanctuary, probably constructed in the latter part of the 8th century. Later it was remade into a larger stepped pyramid structure, with a base approximately 100 meters square. The expansion probably took place in the early 9th Century during the reign of King Jayavarman II, who is widely recognized as the founder of the Khmer Empire. When the West Baray reservoir was built in the 11th Century, Ak Yum was partially buried by the southern dike. The site was excavated in the 1932 under the direction of archaeologist George Trouvé.

Gallery

References

 Higham, Charles. The Civilization of Angkor. University of California Press 2001. p. 96

Angkorian sites in Siem Reap Province
Religious buildings and structures in Cambodia